Kushner is a Jewish surname.

Kushner may also refer to:

 Kushner Companies, a real estate development company 
 Kushner Real Estate Group, a real estate development company 
 Kushner Studios, an architectural firm
 Kushner, Inc. (book), a New York Times bestseller by Vicky Ward
 Rae Kushner Yeshiva High School, Livingston, New Jersey, USA
 Joseph Kushner Hebrew Academy, Livingston, New Jersey, USA; a yeshiva day school
 Kushner equation, an equation for the conditional probability density of the state of a stochastic non-linear dynamical system

See also

 Cedric Kushner Promotions, Ltd. v. King, a SCOTUS RICO case concerning Don King
 The Kushner-Locke Company, a screen production company
 Kushnir (surname)
 
 Kush (disambiguation)